Nina is a Nina Simone tribute album recorded by Xiu Xiu. It was released on Graveface Records on December 3, 2013 to generally favorable reviews.

Recording 

The idea for the album came while frontman Jamie Stewart was on tour with Swans. Nina was recorded in a day. The album features Jamie Stewart's voice, Ches Smith on drums, Tim Berne and Tony Malaby on saxophones, Andrea Parkins on accordion, and Mary Halvorson on guitar. The latter four had experience in avant jazz. The album reimagines rather than recreates Nina Simone's songs. It was released on Graveface Records on December 3, 2013.

Reception 

Nina received a "generally favorable" score of 65 (out of 100) from the ratings aggregator Metacritic, which indicates "generally favorable" reviews. Nate Chinen from The New York Times described the album as accentuating Simone's "spooky, unsettling side". He adds that Stewart's vocals add to the "psychodrama" in "Four Women" and "the wildness" in "Wild Is the Wild". Chinen thought the art rock Nina Simone covers field was already crowded before Nina. Heather Phares of AllMusic considered Stewart's stylistic choices "provocative" and the album Stewart's "most avant-garde ... in years". She added that the album considered the "more progressive aspects" of Simone's music. Kyle Fowle of Slant Magazine thought the album to be Xiu Xiu's "most ambitious ... in years". He thought Stewart's vocal style was out of place on "Don't Explain" and "Just Say I Love Him". Billy Hamilton of Under the Radar wrote that Simone would approve of the album. Mark Richardson of Pitchfork noted a mystical connection between Xiu Xiu and Simone as artists who perform raw emotions, but described the album as a "wasted opportunity" and "weirdly conservative". For this, he blamed Stewart's vocals for being "theatrical" and insincere. Richardson praised the album's selection of songs covered.

Track listing

Personnel
 Jamie Stewart – vocals, writer, producer
 Ches Smith – drums, producer, arrangements

Additional personnel
 Andrea Parker - accordion, electronics, piano, Moog
 Mary Halvorson - guitar
 Tim Berne - alto saxophone, baritone saxophone
 Tony Malaby - tenor saxophone
 Aaron Nevezie - recording engineer
 Chris Koltay - mixing
 Collin Jordan - mastering engineer

References

2013 albums
Xiu Xiu albums
Tribute albums